Sir Walter Pye (1610–1659) of  The Mynde, Much Dewchurch, Herefordshire was an English politician who sat in the House of Commons variously between 1628 and 1640. He supported the Royalist cause in the English Civil War.

Biography
Pye was the son of Walter Pye of The Mynde. In 1628 he was elected Member of Parliament for  Brecon and sat until 1629 when King Charles decided to rule without parliament for eleven years.

In April 1640, Pye was elected MP for Herefordshire in the Short Parliament. He was High Steward of Leominster. He was a supporter of the King and on this account was deprived of his office in 1648.

Family
Pye married Elizabeth, daughter of John Sanders, and had three children. The children remained Catholic and his son Walter maintained allegiance to the exiled Stuarts and lived on the continent where he was given the title Lord Kilpec.

Notes

References

  

1610 births
1659 deaths
People from Brecon
People from Herefordshire
Cavaliers
Members of the Parliament of England (pre-1707) for constituencies in Wales
English MPs 1628–1629
English MPs 1640 (April)